Myles Walter Keogh (25 March 1840 – 25 June 1876) was an Irish soldier. He served in the armies of the Papal States during the war for Italian unification in 1860, and was recruited into the Union Army during the American Civil War, serving as a cavalry officer, particularly under Brig. Gen. John Buford during the Gettysburg Campaign and the three-day Battle of Gettysburg. After the war, Keogh remained in the regular United States Army as commander of I Troop of the 7th Cavalry Regiment under George Armstrong Custer during the Indian Wars, until he was killed along with Custer and all five of the companies directly under Custer's command at the Battle of the Little Bighorn in 1876.

Career 
Myles Keogh was born in Orchard House, Leighlinbridge, County Carlow, on 25 March 1840. The farming carried out at Keogh's home place in Leighlinbridge was arable, barley being the main crop. This meant that the Keogh family were largely unaffected by the hunger and poverty that accompanied the Great Famine and ravaged the country between 1845 and 1850 – Keogh's childhood days. However, two, or possibly three, of Keogh's siblings did die young, apparently from typhoid – a disease associated with the famine and an illness that Myles also suffered as a boy.

He attended the National School in Leighlinbridge where he was enrolled under the spelling 'Miles Kehoe'.<ref name="Kimber">http://www.littlebighorn.info/Articles.htm" – "A Visit to Orchard", Kimber, Doyle 2008</ref> – "At Classics" was recorded as the reason for leaving in 1852. He was long thought to have attended St. Patrick's College in Carlow but that college has not found any proof of his attendance. It is possible that he attended St. Mary's Knockbeg College where, from 1847, young lay pupils from St. Patrick's were sent to be educated.

By 1860, a twenty-year-old Myles Keogh had volunteered, along with over one thousand of his countrymen, to rally to the defence of Pope Pius IX following a call to arms by the Catholic clergy in Ireland. By August 1860, Keogh was appointed second lieutenant of his unit in the Battalion of St. Patrick, Papal Army under the command of General Christophe Léon Louis Juchault de Lamoricière. He was posted at Ancona, a central port city of Italy. The Papal forces were defeated in September in the Battle of Castelfidardo, and Ancona was surrounded. The soldiers, although having admirable defence, were forced to surrender and Keogh was imprisoned at Genoa. After his quick release by exchange, Keogh went to Rome and was invited to wear the spirited green uniforms of the Company of St. Patrick as a member of the Vatican Guard. During his service, the Holy See awarded him the Medaglia for gallantry – the Pro Petri Sede Medal – and also the Cross of a Knight of the Order of St. Gregory the Great – Ordine di San Gregorio.

Now that the fighting was over and duties of the Vatican Guard were more mundane, Keogh saw little purpose in remaining at Rome. With civil war raging in America, Secretary of State William H. Seward began seeking experienced European officers to serve the Union, and called upon a number of prominent clerics to assist in his endeavour. John Hughes, Archbishop of New York, travelled to Italy to recruit veterans of the Papal War, and met with Keogh and his comrades. Thus in March 1862 Keogh resigned his commission in the Company of Saint Patrick, and with his senior officer – 30-year-old Daniel J. Keily of Waterford – returned briefly to Ireland, then boarded the steamer "Kangaroo" bound from Liverpool to New York, where the vessel arrived 2 April. Another Papal comrade, Joseph O'Keeffe – 19-year-old nephew of the Bishop of Cork – met with Keogh and Keily in Washington.

 Through Secretary Seward's intervention, the three were given Captains' rank and on 15 April assigned to the staff of Irish-born Brigadier General James Shields, whose forces were about to confront the Confederate army of Stonewall Jackson. They notably confronted Jackson's army in the Shenandoah Valley at the Battle of Port Republic. Though the Union army was defeated Keogh's courage during his first engagement did not go unnoticed. George B. McClellan, the commander of the Potomac Army, was impressed with Keogh, describing the young Captain as "a most gentlemanlike man, of soldierly appearance," whose "record had been remarkable for the short time he had been in the army." On McClellan's request, Keogh was temporarily transferred to his personal staff. He was to be with 'Little Mac' for only a few months but served the General during the Battle of Antietam. After McClellan's removal from command in November 1862, the admirable traits identified in his first six months in the Union army came to the fore when he and his Papal comrade, Joseph O'Keeffe, were reassigned to General John Buford's staff.

Although held in reserve with the rest of the Union cavalry for the winter of 1862 and during the Battle of Fredericksburg, Myles Keogh and O'Keeffe served Buford with obedience and gallantry during the Stoneman Raid in April 1863 and the battle on 9 June at Brandy Station, which was practically all cavalry. Buford's 1st Division of cavalry fought with distinction in June 1863 as they skirmished with their much vaunted Confederate foe, led by J.E.B. Stuart in Loudoun County, Virginia – most notably at Upperville.

On 30 June, Buford, with Keogh by his side, rode into the small town of Gettysburg. Very soon, Buford realised that he was facing a superior force of rebels to his front and set about creating a defence against the Confederate advance. He was acutely aware of the importance of holding the tactically important high ground about Gettysburg and so he did, beginning one of the most iconic battles in American military history. His intelligent defensive troop alignments, coupled with the bravery and tenacity of his dismounted men, allowed the 1st Corps, under General John F. Reynolds, time to come up in support and thus maintain a Union foothold at strategically important positions. Despite Lee's barrage attack of 140 cannons and a final infantry attack on the third day of the battle, the Union army won a highly significant victory. The importance of Buford's leadership and tactical foresight on 1 July cannot be overstated in its contribution to this victory. Significantly, Myles Keogh received his first brevet for "gallant and meritorious services" during the battle and was promoted to the rank of major.

The battle was over and so were almost 8,000 men's lives with it. However this was a turning point in the war, and a turning point in Buford's health. Five further months of almost constant skirmishing with J.E.B. Stuart's Rebel cavalry at such battles as Funkstown and Willamsport worsened Buford's condition. As Keogh later wrote in Buford's service record (etat de service), Buford "was taken ill from fatique and extreme hardship". By the winter Buford would succumb to typhoid. Keogh would stay by his side and care for him, while they rested in Washington at the home of an old friend General George Stoneman. Buford was buried at West Point Cemetery, as Keogh attended his funeral at Washington and rode with his body on the train.

Major Keogh was now appointed as aide de camp to General George Stoneman. In July 1864, Stoneman raided to the south and southeast, destroying railroads and industrial works. Their risky raids behind Confederate lines were also designed to free federal prisoners held at Macon, Georgia, and liberate the nearly 30,000 captives at Andersonville prison.

Although Stoneman's Union cavalry did destroy the railroads, the onslaught on Macon failed from the beginning and on 31 July 1864, Keogh and Stoneman's command were surrounded during the Battle of Sunshine Church, Georgia. They were captured after both their horses were shot out from under them. Keogh was held for 2½ months as a prisoner of war before being released through Union general William Tecumseh Sherman's efforts. Keogh would later receive a second brevet with promotion to lieutenant colonel for his gallantry with Stoneman at the Battle of Dallas.

The praise garnered from the commanders Myles Keogh served with during the war years was indeed high:

At the war's end, brevet Lt. Colonel Keogh chose to remain on active duty and accepted a Regular Army commission as a second lieutenant in the 4th Cavalry on 4 May 1866.  On 28 July 1866 he was promoted to Captain, and reassigned to the 7th Cavalry at Ft. Riley in Northeast Kansas where he took command of Company I.  The 7th Cavalry Regiment was first commanded by Colonel Andrew Smith (from 1866 to 1869) and subsequently by Colonel Samuel D. Sturgis (from 1869 to 1886). George Armstrong Custer was the regiment's Lieutenant Colonel and its deputy commander.

 Postbellum career 

Keogh was generally well liked by fellow officers although the isolation of military duty on the western frontier often weighed heavily upon him. When depressed he occasionally drank to excess, though he seems not to have fallen prey to the chronic alcoholism that destroyed the careers of many fellow officers of the frontier Regular Army.

There was more than a tinge of melancholy in Keogh's nature, which seemed somehow at odds with his handsome, dashing persona. While he was not given to self-analysis, Keogh once noted: 

Keogh was also fond of the ladies, though he never married: 

He did, however, carry a photograph of Capt. Thomas McDougall's sister, Josephine Buel, with him to Little Bighorn.

Although absent from the Battle of Washita River (1868) and the Yellowstone Expedition (1873), Custer's encounters of substance with hostile Indians, Keogh did have sole responsibility for defending the Smoky Hill route against Indian raids from late 1866 to the summer of 1867. When Sheridan took over from Hancock in 1868, there is evidence that it was to Keogh he turned for first-hand information on conditions on the front line. And while with Sully's expedition later that year, Keogh was fighting Indians almost every day—indeed, it was in one such fight that his new mount, Comanche, received his first wound and, as the story goes, his name. Captain Keogh's frustration with an enemy who did not fight in a conventional manner is evident from a comment he wrote in a personal letter to his family in Ireland: 

In the summer of 1874, Keogh was on leave to visit his homeland on a seven-month leave of absence, while Custer was leading a controversial expedition through the Black Hills. During this second visit home he deeded his inherited Clifden estate in Kilkenny to his sister Margaret. He enjoyed his stay in his homeland, feeling the necessity to support his sisters after the death of both parents.

In October, Keogh returned to Fort Abraham Lincoln for his old duty with Custer, and it would be his last days. As a precaution, he purchased a $10,000 life insurance policy and wrote a letter of warning to his close friends in the Throop-Martin family, Auburn, New York, outlining his burial wishes: 

 

He gave out copies of his will to comrades, and left behind personal papers with instructions that they be burned if he was killed.

Keogh died during Custer's Last Stand – the Battle of the Little Bighorn on 25 June 1876. The senior captain among the five companies wiped out with Custer that day, and commanding one of two squadrons within the Custer detachment, Keogh died in a "last stand" of his own, surrounded by the men of Company I. When the sun-blackened and dismembered dead were buried three days later, Keogh's body was found at the center of a group of troopers that included his two sergeants, company trumpeter and guidon bearer. The slain officer was stripped but not mutilated, perhaps because of the "medicine" the Indians saw in the Agnus Dei ("Lamb of God") he wore on a chain about his neck or because "many of Sitting Bull's warriors" were Catholic. Keogh's left knee had been shattered by a bullet that corresponded to a wound through the chest and flank of his horse, indicating that horse and rider may have fallen together prior to the last rally.

The badly injured animal was found on the fatal battlefield, and nursed back to health as the 7th Cavalry's regimental mascot, which he remained until his death in 1890. This horse, Comanche, is considered the only U.S. military survivor of the battle, though several other badly wounded horses were found and destroyed at the scene. Keogh's bloody gauntlet and the guidon of his Company I were recovered by the army three months after Little Bighorn at the Battle of Slim Buttes.

Originally buried on the battlefield, Keogh's remains were disinterred and taken to Auburn, as he had requested in his will. He was buried at Fort Hill Cemetery on 26 October 1877, an occasion marked by citywide official mourning and an impressive military procession to the cemetery.

Tongue River Cantonment, in southeastern Montana, was renamed after him to be Fort Keogh. The fort was first commanded by Nelson A. Miles. The 55,000-acre fort is today an agricultural experiment station. Miles City, Montana is located two miles from the old fort.

 Funeral We extract from the Auburn papers the following accounts of the burial of the late Col. Myles W. Keogh, at Fort Hill Cemetery, Auburn, NY. 26 October: Promptly at 2pm the funeral procession moved from the St James Hotel, where the pallbearers had assembled, and marched in the following order: The Pall-Bearers; Auburn City Band; Military, Lt. Judge, commanding; Post Crocker, G.A.R.; Post Seward G.A.R.; Hearse, draped with the National colors; Carriages bearing the family of E. T. Throop Martin and Army officers. A detail from Post Seward fired minute guns during the march and the ceremonies at the grave. The flag at the State Armoury was flown at half-mast, as were numerous other flags about the city. Volunteers from the several Auburn organisations of the 49th NY Militia were formed into a company, charged with the duties of escort and firing party, according to military etiquette. At the receiving vault the casket was draped with the American flag, upon which were placed some beautiful floral designs. The bearers then placed the casket in the hearse and the line moved to the grave on the lot of E.T. Throop Martin Esq. The pall-bearers were Gen. W. H. Seward, Col. C.C. Dwight, Col. J. E. Storke, Col. E.D. Woodruff, Surgeon Theo. Dimon, Major L.E. Carpenter, Major W.G. Wise and Capt. W.M. Kirby. The following officers of the regular army were present: Gen. L.C. Hunt, Col. R.N. Scott, Surgeon R.N. O'Reilly, Gen. A. J. Alexander, Lieut. J.W. Martin. The grave was laid with evergreens and flowers, and at its head, the base of a handsome monument to be erected in memory of this dead soldier, was strewn with other floral tributes. The remains were lowered into the grave, when the solemn burial service was read by Rev. Dr. Brainard. A dirge was then executed by the band, after which three volleys of musketry were fired by the military, and the procession marched from the cemetery in the same order as on its entry, the immediate friends remaining until the grave was closed. The obsequies were most solemn and imposing, and in every way befitting the rank and record of the fallen brave in whose honour they were held.The prominent Throop-Martin family, with whom Keogh had become friendly after his comrade General A.J. Alexander married Evelina Martin, was responsible for his burial in their Fort Hill plot and the design of his monument. At the base of decorative, white obelisk there is an inscription taken from the poem, The Song of the Camp by Bayard Taylor:"Sleep soldier still in honored rest, Your truth and valor wearing; The bravest are the tenderest, The loving are the daring."The marble cross atop his grave was added later at the request of his sister in Ireland.

 U.S. military career and ranks 
Appointed Captain, US Volunteers, 9 April 1862

Promoted Major, US Volunteers, 7 April 1864

Brevetted Lieutenant Colonel, US Volunteers, 13 March 1865

Honorably discharged from US Volunteers, 1 September 1866

Appointed Second Lieutenant, Regular Army, 4 May 1866

Promoted Captain, Regular Army, 28 July 1866

Killed in action, 25 June 1876.

 References 

 Further reading 
 Son of the Morning Star, Evan S. Connell, 1984, 
 Classic Battles: Little Big Horn 1876, Peter Panzieri, 1995, 
 Custer and His Commands, Kurt Hamilton Cox, 1999, 
 The Custer Autograph Album, John M. Carroll, 1994, 
 The Little Bighorn Campaign, Wayne Michael Sarf, 1993, 
 Myles Keogh: The Life and Legend of an "Irish Dragoon" in the Seventh Cavalry, John P. Langellier, Kurt Hamilton Cox, Brian C. Pohanka, 1998, 
 The Honor of Arms: A Biography of Myles W. Keogh, Charles L. Convis, 1990, 
 Custer's Fall, David Humphreys Miller, Duell, Sloan and Pierce, Inc., 1957
 http://www.irishtimes.com/newspaper/opinion/2008/1003/1222959302719.html

External links 
 Keogh Family Papers at the Autry National Center

1840 births
1876 deaths
American Civil War prisoners of war
American military personnel killed in the American Indian Wars
American Roman Catholics
Battle of the Little Bighorn
Irish emigrants to the United States (before 1923)
Irish soldiers in Italy
Irish soldiers in the United States Army
Knights of St. Gregory the Great
People educated at St Mary's Knockbeg College
People from County Carlow
People of the Great Sioux War of 1876
Union Army officers
United States Army officers